Patrick Thomas Murphy (born November 28, 1958) is an American baseball coach and manager. He is currently the bench coach for the Milwaukee Brewers of Major League Baseball. He previously served as the interim manager of the San Diego Padres and as the head coach for the college baseball teams representing Arizona State University and the University of Notre Dame.

Playing career
Murphy played baseball at Florida Atlantic University where he played catcher and infield and pitched.  He was honored on FAU's 20th Anniversary Team as a pitcher and utility player and in 2008 was inducted into the school's Baseball Hall of Fame.

Murphy signed a professional baseball contract with the San Francisco Giants in 1982 and played a total of four years in the minor leagues for the Giants, the San Diego Padres and two independent clubs before beginning his coaching career.

Coaching career
Maryville College (1983) 

Murphy served as the head baseball coach and assistant football coach for the Maryville College Fighting Scots.

Notre Dame (1988–1994)
Murphy was hired by the University of Notre Dame as the head coach of the Notre Dame Fighting Irish baseball team on July 11, 1987.

Murphy guided the Fighting Irish to a 318–116–1 (.732) record in South Bend, including consecutive trips to NCAA regional finals in 1992, 1993 and 1994.

Arizona State University (1995–2009)
Murphy was hired by Arizona State University as the head coach of the Arizona State Sun Devils baseball team in 1995. The Sun Devils won the Pac-10 Conference championship in 2000 and consecutive Pac-10 championships in 2007, 2008 and 2009.  Twice in that same decade, Murphy had teams finish in the Top 3 in the country; a feat matched by only ten other schools.  Murphy's ASU teams were consistently present in the national Top 25, including a streak of 100 consecutive weeks in the polls that lasted from 2000 until the middle of 2005.  Murphy led the Sun Devils to the postseason for nine straight seasons and 11 of 12.  His teams set an NCAA record of not being shut out in 506 consecutive games between 1995 and 2004, shattering the previous streak of 349.

Murphy became the youngest collegiate coach to reach 500 career victories in 1998.

In 1998, he won Baseball Americas Coach of the Year award and was Pac-10 Coach of the Year four times (2000, 2007, 2008 and 2009). He led ASU to the College World Series four times (1998, 2005, 2007, 2009).

On November 20, 2009; Murphy resigned while the Arizona State baseball program was under investigation.  It was initially reported that the resignation was his own decision.  However, in December 2009, The Arizona Republic reported that on the day of his resignation, Murphy had been given an ultimatum—resign or be fired.  The NCAA's investigation found Murphy innocent of violations regarding student-athlete employment and recruiting, reprimanding him solely for treating investigators with a "cavalier attitude".  The Arizona State Athletics Department was faulted for Lack of Institutional Control, however, subsequently resulting in the baseball program being sanctioned and banned from postseason play in the 2012 season, as the ASU Athletic Department was a repeat offender.

Murphy's career record at ASU was 629–284–1.

San Diego Padres (2010–2015)
In February 2010, Murphy was hired by the San Diego Padres as Special Assistant to Baseball Operations.
Murphy skippered the Padres' Northwest League affiliate, the Eugene Emeralds, as their manager for the 2011 and 2012 seasons, as the Emeralds had consecutive league-best overall season records. While in Eugene, Coach Murphy compiled a 93–47 record (.664 pct).

Murphy managed the Tucson Padres of the Class AAA Pacific Coast League (PCL) in 2013 and the El Paso Chihuahuas of the PCL in 2014 and 2015. In 2015, the Milwaukee Brewers wanted to hire Murphy as a major league coach on Craig Counsell's coaching staff; Murphy coached Counsell at Notre Dame. The Padres refused to allow him to join the Brewers, even though it would constitute a promotion.

On June 16, 2015, Murphy was appointed the interim manager of the San Diego Padres after then-manager Bud Black was fired. Immediately after the 2015 season, the Padres announced that Murphy would not return as manager.

Milwaukee Brewers (2015–present)
In late October 2015, Murphy was hired as bench coach for the Milwaukee Brewers as part of manager Craig Counsell's makeover of the team's coaching staff; Murphy was Counsell's coach during his playing days at Notre Dame.

Managerial record

Major League Baseball

College coaching record

References

External links

Murph42.com Pat Murphy official site

1958 births
Living people
Arizona State Sun Devils baseball coaches
Baseball coaches from New York (state)
Eugene Emeralds managers
Notre Dame Fighting Irish baseball coaches
Major League Baseball bench coaches
Milwaukee Brewers coaches
Salem Redbirds players
Tri-Cities Triplets players
Florida Atlantic Owls baseball players
San Diego Padres managers
Baseball players from Syracuse, New York